Maumee State Forest is a state forest in Fulton, Henry, and Lucas counties in the U.S. state of Ohio.

References

Ohio state forests
Protected areas of Fulton County, Ohio
Protected areas of Henry County, Ohio
Protected areas of Lucas County, Ohio
Nature_reserves_in_Ohio
Tourist attractions in Fulton County, Ohio
Fulton County, Ohio
Hiking_trails_in_Ohio